Tyler Young may refer to:
 Tyler Young (actor) (born 1990), American actor
 Tyler Young (racing driver) (born 1990), American stock car racing driver